Craig Haydn Roberts (born 21 January 1991) is a Welsh actor and director. He is best known for lead roles as Oliver Tate in the coming-of-age comedy-drama film Submarine (2010) and David Meyers in the series Red Oaks (2014–2017), and for playing Rio Wellard in the television series The Story of Tracy Beaker (2004–2006).

Early life
Roberts was born on 21 January 1991 in Newport, Wales, the son of Alison (Bishop) and Haydn Roberts. He was raised in Maesycwmmer, Caerphilly and attended Lewis School, Pengam. Roberts has a sister, Chelsea, and two half-sisters, Natalee and Angharad.

Career
Roberts began his television career in the dramas Care (2000) and Little Pudding (2003). After these he was given roles in the series The Story of Tracy Beaker (2004–2006) and Casualty (2005–2008), and played vampire fanatic Robin Branagh in Young Dracula (2006–2008). He also appeared in the dramas Kiddo (2005) and Scratching (2006).

On stage, Roberts toured Britain in 2008 with Y Touring Theatre Company, playing young Ryan in Full Time, a play that explores racism, sexism and homophobia in football; in January 2009 he played the evil queen's sidekick Drax in the pantomime Snow White at Worthing.

In 2010, Roberts had worldwide success with the teenage lead role in the film Submarine, based on the 2008 novel by Joe Dunthorne. It was directed by Richard Ayoade and also starred Paddy Considine and Yasmin Paige.

Since then Roberts has appeared in the BBC Three television show Being Human (2011, 2012) and in the online spin-off series Becoming Human (2011) as Adam.
 
In 2012, he starred in The Killers' music video for "Here with Me" with Winona Ryder, directed by Tim Burton. He also starred in Kassidy’s music video for “One Man Army” in 2012. 

In late 2012, Roberts started working on a short television comedy he wrote and directed, entitled The Sheepish Approach. In 2014, he starred in the film Jolene: The Indie Folk Star alongside Charlotte Ritchie and Rosamund Hanson. He played the role of Dom in the seventh series of the TV show Skins, and "Assjuice" in the 2014 film Neighbors. He also appeared in the Manic Street Preachers video for Show Me the Wonder and directed the music video for the Los Campesinos! single "Avocado, Baby" from their album No Blues.

In 2015, Roberts made his feature-director debut with Just Jim, which he also wrote and starred in.

On 9 October 2015, Amazon Studios released Season 1 of Red Oaks, an original comedy series where Roberts stars alongside Paul Reiser. Season 2 was released in late 2016, after which the show was renewed for a third and final season.

Roberts starred in the 2016 film The Fundamentals of Caring alongside Paul Rudd. He played Trevor, a quick-witted 18-year-old boy with Duchenne muscular dystrophy. The film premièred at the Sundance Film Festival in January and was released on Netflix in June.

In 2019, Roberts appeared in the film Horrible Histories: The Movie – Rotten Romans as Emperor Nero.

Filmography

Film

Television

Music videos

Awards and nominations

British Independent Film Awards

London Critics Circle Film Awards

Empire Awards

BAFTA Awards, Wales

Fantasporto film festival Awards

References

External links

1991 births
Living people
21st-century Welsh male actors
People educated at Lewis School, Pengam
People from Caerphilly
People from Newport, Wales
Welsh directors
Welsh male child actors
Welsh male film actors
Welsh male television actors